John Fay (February 10, 1773June 21, 1855) was an American politician from New York.

Life
Fay attended the common schools for a period of only six months. He removed to New York with his parents, who settled in Montgomery County, and later in Galway, Saratoga County.

In 1804, Fay removed to Northampton, then in Montgomery County. He became a land surveyor and later engaged in agricultural pursuits, milling, and manufacturing. He held various local offices and was Postmaster of Northampton for several years. He was a member from Montgomery County of the New York State Assembly in 1808-09 and 1812.

Fay was elected as a Democratic-Republican to the 16th United States Congress, holding office from March 4, 1819, to March 3, 1821. Afterwards he resumed his former activities. He was a presidential elector on the Democratic James K. Polk ticket in 1844.

He was buried at the Old Presbyterian Church Cemetery in Northampton.

References

The New York Civil List compiled by Franklin Benjamin Hough (pages 70, 182, 186, 273, 322, 330; Weed, Parsons and Co., 1858)

1773 births
1855 deaths
People from Hardwick, Massachusetts
People from Montgomery County, New York
People from Galway, New York
1844 United States presidential electors
Democratic-Republican Party members of the United States House of Representatives from New York (state)
People from Northampton, Fulton County, New York
American surveyors